Koenraad Sanders (Bruges, 17 December 1962) is a former Belgian footballer. He is the younger brother of footballer Luc Sanders.

Honours

Player 
Club Brugge

 Belgian Cup: 1982-83 (runners-up)
 Belgian Supercup: 1980
 Bruges Matins: 1981
 Japan Cup Kirin World Soccer: 1981

KV Mechelen

 Belgian First Division: 1988–89
 Belgian Cup: 1986–87 (winners), 1990-91 (runners-up), 1991-92 (runners-up)
 European Cup Winners Cup: 1987–88 (winners)
 European Super Cup: 1988
 Amsterdam Tournament: 1989
Joan Gamper Trophy: 1989
 Jules Pappaert Cup: 1990

References 

1962 births
Living people
Belgian footballers
K.V. Mechelen players
Club Brugge KV players
Association football midfielders